Sevenum is a town in the province of Limburg in the southeastern Netherlands. Until 2010, it was also the name of the municipality comprising the towns of Sevenum, Kronenberg and Evertsoord. Amusement park Toverland is located in sevenum.

Location 
Sevenum's neighbour towns are (clockwise, starting from East): Blerick, Venlo, Maasbree, Kronenberg, Grubbenvorst, Hegelsom, Horst, Grubbenvorst.

Sevenum-town and Kronenberg are tangented by highway E34, provincial road N277 (Middenpeelweg), and the railroad track Eindhoven-Venlo; Evertsoord lies on the edge of the Peel, a former peatland.

Dialect
Sevenum's dialect, "Zaerums", is transitional between Limburgish, North-Limburgish (see Low Rhenish), and Brabantian, which all have tentative borders within a larger dialect continuum. In the diagram "Kleverlandish" on this page, Sevenum is situated near the bottom-left corner of the blue area, which is the intersection of the horizontal "ich/ik" isogloss (the Uerdingen line) with the vertical "kalt/koud" isogloss.

The overview of town names in Limburgish at Streektaal.net  lists "Zaerum" (Sevenum) and "De Kroeënenberg" (Kronenberg), but it doesn't include "De Pieël" (Evertsoord), considering it to be in the North-Limburgish area.

Gallery

References

External links
 Tourist information for Northern Limburg
 

Municipalities of the Netherlands disestablished in 2010
Populated places in Limburg (Netherlands)
Former municipalities of Limburg (Netherlands)
Horst aan de Maas